Parmotrema arteagum is a species of lichen in the family Parmeliaceae. It was described as new to science in 1982 by Robert Egan. Found in west-central Mexico, the holotype collection was made in Arteaga, after which the lichen is named. Parmotrema arteagum is a member of the Parmotrema perforans species complex because of its broad lobes with cilia at the margins, perforations in the apothecia, and lower surfaces with white borders that lack rhizines.

See also
List of Parmotrema species

References

arteagum
Lichen species
Lichens described in 1982
Lichens of Mexico
Taxa named by Robert Shaw Egan